Keratin, type I cytoskeletal 19 also known as cytokeratin-19 (CK-19) or keratin-19 (K19) is a 40 kDa protein that in humans is encoded by the KRT19 gene. Keratin 19 is a type I keratin.

Function 
Keratin 19 is a member of the keratin family. The keratins are intermediate filament proteins responsible for the structural integrity of epithelial cells and are subdivided into cytokeratins and hair keratins.

Keratin 19 is a type I keratin. The type I cytokeratins consist of acidic proteins which are arranged in pairs of heterotypic keratin chains. Unlike its related family members, this smallest known acidic cytokeratin is not paired with a basic cytokeratin in epithelial cells. It is specifically found in the periderm, the transiently superficial layer that envelops the developing epidermis. The type I cytokeratins are clustered in a region of chromosome 17q12-q21.

Use as biomarker 
KRT19 is also known as Cyfra 21-1.Due to its high sensitivity, KRT19 is the most used marker for the RT-PCR-mediated detection of tumor cells disseminated in lymph nodes, peripheral blood, and bone marrow of breast cancer patients. Depending on the assays, KRT19 has been shown to be both a specific and a non-specific marker. False positivity in such KRT19 RT-PCR studies include: illegitimate transcription (expression of small amounts of KRT19 mRNA by tissues in which it has no real physiological role), haematological disorders (KRT19 induction in peripheral blood cells by cytokines and growth factors, which circulate at higher concentrations in inflammatory conditions and neutropenia), the presence of pseudogenes (two KRT19 pseudogenes, KRT19a and KRT19b, have been identified, which have significant sequence homology to KRT19 mRNA. Subsequently, attempts to detect the expression of the authentic KRT19 may result in the detection of either or both of these pseudogenes), sample contamination (introduction of contaminating epithelial cells during peripheral blood sampling for subsequent RT-PCR analysis). Moreover, Ck-19 is widely applied as post-operative diagnostic marker of papillary thyroid carcinoma.

Keratin 19 is often used together with keratin 8 and keratin 18 to differentiate cells of epithelial origin from hematopoietic cells in tests that enumerate circulating tumor cells in blood.

Interactions 
Keratin 19 has been shown to interact with Pinin.

References

Further reading 

 
 
 
 
 
 
 
 
 
 
 
 
 
 
 
 
 
 
 

Keratins
Tumor markers